The Access for Afghan Women Act of 2003 is a bill introduced in the United States House of Representatives by Representatives Carolyn Maloney (Democrat, New York) and Dana Rohrabacher (Republican, California). The bill was submitted on March 27, 2003, to the House of Representatives and was immediately referred to the House Committee on International Relations.

Human rights for Afghan women and girls

Lead 
The bill was introduced due to concerns that women remained marginalized in the re-development of Afghanistan. Additionally, in the early 2000s the circumstances of women in Afghanistan remained precarious despite the overthrow of the Taliban regime during the United States-led Afghanistan campaign (U.S. invasion of Afghanistan). The bill addresses assistance for Afghan women and girls in regards to political and human rights, health care, education, training, security, and shelter.

The bill seeks to secure improved circumstances and promote opportunities for women by incorporating them within the reconstruction and on-going development efforts being undertaken in Afghanistan.

The bill attempts to secure these by appropriating funding, establishing aid allocation requirements, defining objectives of United States international policy in Afghanistan, and setting standards of behavior for the United States in executing policy.

Article Body 
From 1996, the Taliban enforced a very strict set of laws known as Sharia, that ultimately isolated women from society. These same laws banned any sort of entertainment such as television or books. After the terrorist attack on September 11, 2001, the United States increasingly started taking control. The events that occurred on 9/11 resulted in U.S involvement in Afghanistan, against the Taliban. The establishment of the Access for Afghan Women Act of 2003 was and continues to be an effort to protect Afghan women and girls from continuing to be oppressed.

Ever since the Taliban took power, young women and girls have been deprived of education in Afghanistan. While the basis of the Access for Afghan Women Act is to provide Afghan women with access to basic human rights such as security, health care, and education, it is also a way to figure out how to educate those who have not had the privilege of having an education for such a long period of time.

Conclusion 
Overall, the bill attempts to secure human rights for Afghan women by appropriating funding, establishing aid allocation requirements, defining objectives of United States international policy in Afghanistan, and setting standards of behavior for the United States in executing policy.

The text of the bill, its status, and further information can be found at the following site:

Thomas Legislative Information

See also
 Women's rights in Afghanistan

References 

Afghanistan–United States relations
Proposed legislation of the 108th United States Congress
Women's rights in Afghanistan
2003 in women's history